Children of E.L.B.  is the second official album by Norwegian band Soup. It was released in February 2010. The double CD is the first Soup release to be recorded as a band, rather than solely by multi-instrumentalist, writer and singer Erlend Viken. It is also the first studio album released by the band through How Is Annie Records, whom they had signed with in 2008.

The album was co-produced with Motorpsycho guitarist Hans Magnus Ryan. The sleeve design was by Lasse Hoile, a well-known artist in rock circles who has worked with the likes of Steven Wilson and Dream Theater.

Despite being voted album of the year in 2010 in Viken's home country of Norway by Paul A. Nordal in Panorama Media's annual music review, and being critically well received across a number of European countries, it remains a largely undiscovered classic.

Track listing
All tracks written and arranged by Erlend Viken.
"We Share the Same Breath" – 5:22
"Leaving the Harbour" – 4:31
"In Memory of Richard Wright" – 8:41
"Streams"	 – 2:08
"The Roots are Decaying" – 7:13
"Utopia" – 4:20
"The Roots are Decaying Pt 2" – 4:14
"Playground Memories" – 7:49
"She Had Set Out to Find the Sun" – 8:42
"Surrounded by Ghosts" – 3:53
"Children of E.L.B. Pt 1 & 2" – 7:39
"Glaciers" – 2:10
"Northern Patriarch" – 3:34
"0805" – 5:19
"We Share the Same Breath Pt 2" – 5:50

Personnel 
Erlend Aastad Viken – vocals, keyboards
Ørjan Saur – guitars, backing vocals
Rune Leraand – bass, backing vocals
Sverre Leraand – drums
Hans Magnus Ryan – additional guitar (tracks 6, 8, 11)
Elling Snøfugl – cello (track 1)
 Audun Berg Selfjord – cello (track 4)
Lars Magnus Steinum – violin (track 10)

References 

Soup (band) albums
2010 albums